Stuart Poulter (20 January 1889 – 30 September 1956) was an Australian long-distance runner. He competed in the marathon at the 1912 Summer Olympics.

References

1889 births
1956 deaths
Athletes (track and field) at the 1912 Summer Olympics
Australian male long-distance runners
Australian male marathon runners
Olympic athletes of Australasia
Athletes from Sydney